The Black Diamond Express is a 1927 silent railroad feature film drama directed by Howard Bretherton and starring Monte Blue. It was produced and distributed by Warner Bros. It is not to be confused with several early short actuality styled films under the title Black Diamond Express for example the famous and still exiting 1896 film of a train arriving in a station.

This film is presumed lost.

Cast
Monte Blue as Dan Foster
Edna Murphy as Jeanne Harmon
Myrtle Stedman as Mrs. Harmon
Claire McDowell as Martha, Dan's sister
Carroll Nye as Fred, Dan's brother
William Demarest as Fireman
J. W. Johnston as Sheldon Truesdell

See also
List of early Warner Bros. sound and talking features

References

External links

lobby poster
2nd lobby poster

1927 films
American silent feature films
Films directed by Howard Bretherton
Lost American films
Rail transport films
Warner Bros. films
1927 drama films
American black-and-white films
Silent American drama films
1927 lost films
Lost drama films
1920s American films